Mont Nabemba is the highest mountain in Republic of the Congo.

Nabemba Tower in Brazzaville is named after the mountain.

Mining 
Iron ore deposits are located in the vicinity.  Sundance Resources are drilling in preparation to mine the total mountain.

References 

Nabemba
Highest points of countries